Xavier Alexander (born October 19, 1988) is an American professional basketball player for the Kaohsiung Aquas of the T1 League. He played college basketball for the George Washington University and Southern Nazarene University.

High school career
Alexander attended Midwest City High School in Midwest City, Oklahoma. As a senior, he averaged 23.0 points and 10.0 rebounds per game, helping the Bombers post a 27–1 record in 2006–07.

College career

George Washington
In his freshman season at George Washington, Alexander played 23 games, averaging 4.0 points, 3.8 rebounds, 1.3 assists and 1.1 steals per game. In his sophomore season, he played 13 games, averaging 3.5 points, 3.2 rebounds, 1.5 assists and 1.1 steals per game.

Southern Nazarene
In 2009, Alexander transferred to Southern Nazarene University. In his junior season, he was named to the All-NAIA D1 first team. In 31 games, he averaged 13.0 points, 6.7 rebounds, 3.6 assists, 1.1 blocks and 1.3 steals per game. In his senior season, he earned All-Sooner Athletic Conference first team and NAIA All-American honors. In 32 games, he averaged 17.7 points, 6.6 rebounds, 3.3 assists and 1.2 steals per game.

Professional career
Alexander went undrafted in the 2011 NBA draft.

Tulsa 66ers 
On November 3, 2011, he was selected in the eighth round of the 2011 NBA D-League draft by the Tulsa 66ers.

Siarka Tarnobrzeg 
On August 9, 2012, he signed with Siarka Tarnobrzeg of Poland for the 2012–13 season.

Tulsa 66ers (second stint) 
In November 2013, he was reacquired by the Tulsa 66ers.

Oklahoma City Blue 
On November 4, 2014, he was acquired by the Oklahoma City Blue.

Singapore Slingers 
On October 4, 2015, Alexander signed with the Singapore Slingers of the ASEAN Basketball League. Alexander signed with the Singapore Slingers for a fifth consecutive season since 2015.

Kaohsiung Aquas 
On September 10, 2021, Alexander signed with the Kaohsiung Aquas of the T1 League.

Singapore Slingers (second stint) 
On October 25, 2022, Alexander re-signed with the Singapore Slingers of the ASEAN Basketball League.

Kaohsiung Aquas (second stint) 
On March 8, 2023, Kaohsiung Aquas registered Alexander as import player. On March 17, Alexander re-signed with the Kaohsiung Aquas of the T1 League.

ABL career statistics

|-
| align=left | 2015–16
| align=left | Singapore
| 28 || 28 || 36.5 || .430 || .170 || .520 || 10.0 || 5.4 || 2.3 || .8 || 18.1
|-
| align=left | 2016–17
| align=left | Singapore
| 25 || 25 || 39.2 || .490 || .260 || .610 || 9.8 || 6.2 || 2.7 || .8 || 19.3
|-
| align=left | 2017–18
| align=left | Singapore
| 23 || 23 || 39.5 || .450 || .290 || .680 || 9.5 || 7.4 || 2.6 || .7 || 24.6
|-
| align=left | 2018–19
| align=left | Singapore
| 36 || 36 || 39.2 || .450 || .330 || .720 || 8.8 || 7.9 || 1.8 || .5 || 21.3
|-
|- class="sortbottom"
| style="text-align:center;" colspan="2"| Career
| 112 || 112 || 38.7 || .450 || .280 || .640 || 9.5 || 6.8 || 2.2 || .7 || 20.8
|-

References

External links
SNU bio

ABL Career Statistics

1988 births
Living people
American expatriate basketball people in Mexico
American expatriate basketball people in Poland
American expatriate basketball people in Taiwan
American expatriate basketball people in Thailand
American expatriate sportspeople in Singapore
American men's basketball players
Siarka Tarnobrzeg (basketball) players
Basketball players from Oklahoma
George Washington Colonials men's basketball players
Halcones de Xalapa players
Kaohsiung Aquas players
T1 League imports
Oklahoma City Blue players
Shooting guards
Singapore Slingers players
Small forwards
Southern Nazarene Crimson Storm men's basketball players
Sportspeople from Oklahoma County, Oklahoma
Tulsa 66ers players